The 2013 FIA World Rally Championship-3 was the first season of the World Rally Championship-3, an auto racing championship recognised by the Fédération Internationale de l'Automobile, running in support of the World Rally Championship. It was created when the Group R class of rally car was introduced in 2013.

Unlike its predecessor, the Production Car World Rally Championship, the World Rally Championship-3 does not have a fixed calendar. Instead, teams and drivers competing in the series are free to contest any of thirteen rallies that form the 2013 World Rally Championship. They must nominate up to six events to score points in, and their best five results from these six events will count towards their final championship points score. The World Rally Championship is open to two-wheel drive cars complying with R1, R2 and R3 regulations.

Also in WRC-3, the Citroën Top Driver was established. Within the WRC-3, the drivers race in identical Citroën DS3 R3T cars, with the winner receiving the opportunity to race in the Citroën DS3 R5, in the 2014 season.

Sébastien Chardonnet clinched the Drivers' Championship at the Rallye de France-Alsace.

Teams and drivers

The following teams and drivers will take part in the 2013 World Rally Championship-3 season:

Notes:
 — Additional letters refer to the specific designation of a car within each class under Group R rules.

Driver changes
 After contesting the Rallye Monte Carlo in the WRC class, Bryan Bouffier entered the WRC-3 series.
 Sébastien Chardonnet will enter a Citroën DS3 built to R3T specifications and run with the support of the Citroën World Rally Team. Chardonnet had previously contested the 2012 Rallye de France — Alsace in a WRC-spec DS3.
 Three-time British Rally Champion Keith Cronin entered a Citroën DS3 R3T at selected events.

Rally summaries

Championship standings

Drivers' championship
Points are awarded to the top 10 classified finishers.

 † – Stéphane Consani admitted illegally recceing a Rallye de France-Alsace stage on the month of October. This action result on the rally stewards having his points withdrawn and was suspended from the final two rounds of the season.

Co-Drivers' Championship

Teams' Championship

References

www.fia.com/

External links
Official website of the World Rally Championship

World Rally Championship-2